The Texas League has operated primarily in the South Central United States since 1902, except during World War II, when it shut down from 1943 to 1945.  For the 2021 season, the league was named the Double-A Central before switching back to its previous moniker in 2022. Over that -season span, its teams relocated, changed names, transferred to different leagues, or ceased operations altogether. This list documents teams which played in the league.

Teams

Map

See also

List of Eastern League teams
List of Southern League teams
List of Texas League stadiums

References

External links

 
Texas League teams
Texas League